Success is the achievement of a desired result.

Success may also refer to:

Places

United States

 Success, Arkansas, United States
 Success, Kansas, United States
 Success, Michigan, ghost town
 Success, Mississippi, United States
 Success, Missouri, United States
 Success, New Hampshire, United States
 Success, Ohio, United States
 Success Dam, across the Tule River, California, United States
 Success Glacier, in the U.S. state of Washington
 Success Lake, man-made lake in New Jersey, United States
 Success Lake (Connecticut), reservoir in Connecticut, United States
 Success Pond, in the U.S. state of New Hampshire

Elsewhere
 Success, Western Australia, a suburb of Perth, Western Australia
 Success, Saskatchewan, Canada
 Success Bank, a shallow sea bank off Fremantle, Western Australia
 Success Hill railway station, in Perth, Western Australia
 Success Park 'n' Ride, a bus station in Perth, Western Australia

Media and entertainment

Film and television
 Success (1923 film), a silent drama film
 Success (1984 film), a 1984 Soviet film
 Success (1991 film), a 1991 German film
 Success (2003 film), a 2003 Indian film

Literature
 Success (novel), a 1978 novel by Martin Amis
 Success (magazine), a business magazine in the United States
 "Success is Counted Sweetest", a poem by Emily Dickinson published under the title "Success"

Music
 "Success" (Loretta Lynn song), from the 1962 album Loretta Lynn Sings
 Success (The Weather Girls album), and the title song
 Success (The Posies album), 1998
 "Success" (Sigue Sigue Sputnik song), 1988
 "Success" (Dannii Minogue song), 1991

Organizations
 Success Academy (disambiguation)
 Success Automobile Manufacturing Company, a defunct auto company in St. Louis, Missouri, United States
 Success University, Dallas, Texas
 Success (company), a computer game developer and publisher
 S.U.C.C.E.S.S., a Chinese Canadian organization headquartered in Vancouver

Ships
 , various Royal Navy ships
 , two Royal Australian Navy ships
 , two US Navy vessels
 Success (prison ship), an Australian prison hulk and museum ship, 1840–1946
 Success (shipwreck), shipwreck off the coast of Whitefish Dunes State Park in Sevastopol, Wisconsin

People
 Isaac Success (born 1996), Nigerian footballer

See also

 
 
 Toyota Succeed, a station wagon
 "Successful" (song), a 2009 song by Canadian rapper Drake
 "Successful" (Ariana Grande song), from the album Sweetener (2018)
 Succession (disambiguation)
 Successor (disambiguation)